Jeffrey Molina (born July 17, 1997) is an American mixed martial artist who competes in the Flyweight division of the Ultimate Fighting Championship (UFC).

Background
Molina was born in Lakewood, New Jersey. He attended Olathe South High School, where he participated in wrestling. He started training MMA at age 14, coached by Jason High and LC Davis. In 2017, he began training with James Krause at Glory MMA.

Mixed martial arts career

Early career
Molina began his professional after a successful 9-0 amateur career. His professional debut took place on Jun 2, 2017 at VFC: Fight Night Harrah's 5, where he lost the bout to Steven Merrill via rear-naked choke in the first round. He rebounded at VFC 58, where he submitted Delfino Benitez via rear-naked choke in the first round. Molina would go on to lose his next bout against Nate Smith via close split decision at Victory FC: Fight Night Coco Key. Afterwards, Molina would go on to win his next 4 bouts via stoppages, before appearing at LFA 76, submitting Chauncey Wilson via rear-naked choke in round one. Molina would go on to submit Kenny Porter via arm-triangle choke at FAC 2.

Molina was invited to Dana White's Contender Series 30 on August 25, 2020, where he faced Jacob Silva, winning the bout via unanimous decision and earning a UFC contract.

Ultimate Fighting Championship
Molina was scheduled to face Zarrukh Adashev on November 14, 2020, at UFC Fight Night: Felder vs. dos Anjos, before the bout was rescheduled for UFC Fight Night 185. However, Molina withdrew from the event at the end of December 2020.

Molina made his UFC debut against Aori Qileng on April 24, 2021 at UFC 261. He won the bout via unanimous decision. The bout earned Aori a Fight of the Night bonus award.

In his sophomore performance, Molina faced Daniel da Silva on October 23, 2021 at UFC Fight Night: Costa vs. Vettori. He won the bout via TKO stoppage early in the second round.

Molina faced Zhalgas Zhumagulov on June 4, 2022 at UFC Fight Night: Volkov vs. Rozenstruik. He won the bout via controversial split decision. 12 out of 13 media scores gave it to Zhumagulov.

Molina was set to face Jimmy Flick on January 14, 2023 at UFC Fight Night 217. However, Molina withdrew from the event for undisclosed reasons and was replaced by Charles Johnson.

Molina is suspended by the NYAC and NSAC effective as of November 5, 2022, linking to a result of suspicious betting activity ahead of the November 5 UFC fight between Darrick Minner and Shayilan Nuerdanbieke, and Molina is temporary barred from the UFC until the matter is resolved.

Support for LGBTQ rights
Molina wore UFC Pride Month shorts during his fight with Zhalgas Zhumagulov in order to benefit the LGBTQ Center of Southern Nevada, which is the beneficiary of profits from sales of the UFC Pride Month T-shirts. He faced fierce backlash from some MMA fans. Molina expressed surprise to see such a reaction in 2022, and frustration at the perceived bigotry of those attacking him on social media.

Personal life
Following the leak of a private sex tape, Molina came out as bisexual in March 2023, which made him the first openly LGBT male UFC fighter.

Championships and accomplishments
Ultimate Fighting Championship
Fight of the Night (One time)

Mixed martial arts record

|-
|Win
|align=center|11–2
|Zhalgas Zhumagulov
|Decision (split) 
|UFC Fight Night: Volkov vs. Rozenstruik
|
|align=center|3
|align=center|5:00
|Las Vegas, Nevada, United States
| 
|-
|Win
|align=center|10–2
|Daniel da Silva
|TKO (elbows and punches)
|UFC Fight Night: Costa vs. Vettori
|
|align=center|2
|align=center|0:46
|Las Vegas, Nevada, United States
|
|-
|Win
|align=center|9–2
|Aori Qileng
|Decision (unanimous)
|UFC 261
|
|align=center|3
|align=center|5:00
|Jacksonville, Florida, United States
|
|-
|Win
|align=center|8–2
|Jacob Silva
|Decision (unanimous)
|Dana White's Contender Series 30
|
|align=center|3
|align=center|5:00
||Las Vegas, Nevada, United States
|
|-
|Win
|align=center|7–2
|Kenny Porter
|Submission (arm-triangle choke)
|FAC 2
|
|align=center|2
|align=center|2:38
|Independence, Missouri, United States
|
|-
|Win
|align=center|6–2
|Chance Wilson
|Submission (rear-naked choke)
|LFA 76
|
|align=center|1
|align=center|2:01
|Park City, Kansas, United States
|
|-
|Win
|align=center|5–2
|Johnnie Roades
|Submission (rear-naked choke)
|KC Fighting Alliance 34
|
|align=center|1
|align=center|4:16
|Independence, Missouri, United States
|
|-
|Win
|align=center|4–2
|Joey Estrada
|TKO (submission to punches)
|KC Fighting Alliance 30
|
|align=center|1
|align=center|4:15
|Independence, Missouri, United States
|
|-
|Win
|align=center|3–2
|Joey Scanlan
|TKO (punches)
|Carden Combat Sports 4
|
|align=center|1
|align=center|0:51
|Kansas City, Kansas, United States
| 
|-
|Win
|align=center|2–2
|Chance Camacho
|TKO (punches)
|KC Fighting Alliance 27
|
|align=center|2
|align=center|1:22
|Independence, Missouri, United States
|
|-
|Loss
|align=center|1–2
|Nate Smith
|Decision (split)
|Victory FC: Fight Night Coco Key
|
|align=center|3
|align=center|5:00
|Omaha, Nebraska, United States
|
|-
|Win
|align=center|1–1
|Delfino Benitez
|Submission (rear-naked choke)
|Victory FC 58
|
|align=center|1
|align=center|4:43
|Omaha, Nebraska, United States
|
|-
|Loss
|align=center|0–1
|Steven Merrill
|Submission (rear-naked choke)
|Victory FC: Fight Night at Harrahs 5
|
|align=center|1
|align=center|1:03
|Council Bluffs, Iowa, United States
|

See also 
 List of current UFC fighters
 List of male mixed martial artists
 List of UFC bonus award recipients

References

External links 
  
 

1997 births
21st-century American LGBT people
Amateur wrestlers
American male mixed martial artists
American male sport wrestlers
Bisexual men
Flyweight mixed martial artists
LGBT mixed martial artists
LGBT people from New Jersey
Living people
Mixed martial artists utilizing wrestling
People from Lakewood Township, New Jersey
Ultimate Fighting Championship male fighters